George Beck may refer to:

George Beck (artist) (1749–1812), Anglo-American artist and poet
George T. Beck (1856–1943), American politician and entrepreneur in Wyoming
George Beck (baseball) (1890–1973), American baseball player
George Beck (bishop) (1904–1978), English Roman Catholic Archbishop of Liverpool
George Beck (1907–1999), American film and TV writer, director and producer (1951's Behave Yourself!)
George Beck, Canadian country music performer during 1960s who worked with Fred McKenna
George L. Beck Jr. (born 1941), United States Attorney in Alabama
George Beck, athlete representing United States at the 2020 Winter Youth Olympics#Ski mountaineering

See also
Admiral Sir George Back (1796–1878), British Royal Navy explorer of Canadian Arctic, naturalist and artist
George Lewis Becke (1855–1913), Australian writer
Lindsay George Beck (1900–1982), Australian rules footballer in SANFL and VFL